Rika Fujiwara and Yuki Naito were the defending champions, but Fujiwara chose not to participate. Naito partnered Erina Hayashi but lost in the first round to Choi Ji-hee and Han Na-lae.

Duan Yingying and Han Xinyun won the title, defeating Akiko Omae and Peangtarn Plipuech in the final, 6–3, 4–6, [10–4].

Seeds

Draw

Draw

References
Main Draw

Kangaroo Cup
Kangaroo Cup - Doubles
2019 in Japanese tennis